Aleksandar Zečević (born October 3, 1996), is a Serbian professional basketball player for Zastal Zielona Góra of the Polish Basketball League (PLK).

College career 
Native of Futog, a suburban town of the city of Novi Sad, Zečević began playing in local clubs at the age of six. At the last year of the high school, he played for basketball club Tamiš in Pančevo.

He attended Scotland Performance Institute in Chambersburg, Pennsylvania and committed to play with the Florida Atlantic University Owls, where in the next two seasons he averaged 5.5 points and 4.1 rebounds per game. also winning Mostlow State College Region 7 Tennessee Championship.

College statistics

Professional career 
After going undrafted in the 2020 NBA Draft, on August 9, 2020 Zečević joined the roster of the MBK Baník Handlová of the Slovak Basketball League (SBL), the first tier of basketball in Slovakia.

On July 29, 2021, he signed with Kharkivski Sokoly of the Ukrainian Basketball Superleague.

On August 5, 2022, he has signed with Zastal Zielona Góra of the Polish Basketball League (PLK).

References

External links 
 Realgm.com
 NCAA Stats

1996 births
Living people
Basket Zielona Góra players
Basketball players from Novi Sad
BC Kharkivski Sokoly players
Florida Atlantic Owls men's basketball players
MBK Handlová players
San Jacinto Central Ravens men's basketball players
Serbian men's basketball players
Serbian expatriate basketball people in Slovakia
Serbian expatriate basketball people in the United States
Serbian expatriate basketball people in Ukraine